The 1864 Michigan gubernatorial election was held on November 8, 1864. Republican nominee Henry H. Crapo defeated Democratic nominee William M. Fenton with 55.15% of the vote.

General election

Candidates
Major party candidates
Henry H. Crapo, Republican
William M. Fenton, Democratic

Results

References

1864
Michigan
Gubernatorial
November 1864 events